Cantharocnemis antennatus is a species of longhorn beetles of the subfamily Prioninae.

Description

Distribution
This species can be found in Kenya and Somalia.

References
 Biolib
 Prioninae of the world

Prioninae
Beetles described in 1938